Return of the Joker may refer to:

 Batman: Return of the Joker, a 1991 platform video game
 Batman Beyond: Return of the Joker, a 2000 American direct-to-video animated film